The Leap into the Void (German: Der Sprung ins Nichts) is a 1932 American drama film directed by Leo Mittler and starring Cilly Feindt, Aribert Mog and Sigurd Lohde.

It was made at the Joinville Studios in Paris as the German-language version of the 1929 film Halfway to Heaven. Versions were also made in three other languages. multi-language versions were common in the early years of sound films before the technology of dubbing became better perfected.

Cast
 Cilly Feindt as Greta  
 Aribert Mog as Fred  
 Sigurd Lohde as Jim  
 Hermann Blaß as Der Direktor  
 Erich Kestin as Slim  
 Lucie Euler as Madame Elsie 
 Ida Perry as Mrs. Lee  
 Wolfgang Lohmeyer as Erik Lee  
 Marguerite Roma 
 Robert Eckert as Tony

References

Bibliography
 Jan-Christopher Horak. Fluchtpunkt Hollywood: eine Dokumentation zur Filmemigration nach 1933. MAkS, 1986.

External links
 

1932 films
American drama films
1932 drama films
1930s German-language films
Films directed by Leo Mittler
Paramount Pictures films
Films shot in France
Films shot at Joinville Studios
American multilingual films
American black-and-white films
1932 multilingual films
1930s American films